Lapitch the Little Shoemaker is an animated television series from Croatia Film and EM.TV/HaffaDiebold, with animation by Neptuno Films of Barcelona, Spain. It is a spin-off from the 1997 film of the same name.

Returning from the film are the title character, Lapitch the mouse, and his girlfriend Lisa, along with their pets Brewster and Pico. For the series, a character called Melchior replaces Master Scowler's role.

The show was formerly aired on Tiny Pop in the United Kingdom.

Episodes

Voices
Teresa Gallagher - Lapitch, Percival Periwinkle III (English version)
Nigel Greaves - (English version)
Liza Ross - Yanna, Brunhilda, Queen Rat, Auntie (English version)
Peter Marinker - Dirty Rat (English version)
Toni Barry - (English version)
George Roubicek - (English version)
Sean Barrett - Melchoir (English version)
Colin Bruce - (English version)

References

External links

2000s Croatian television series
2000s animated television series
2001 Croatian television series debuts
2002 Croatian television series endings
2001 German television series debuts
2002 German television series endings
Australian Broadcasting Corporation original programming
Croatian animated television series
Croatian comedy television series
Croatian children's television series
German children's animated comedy television series
German children's animated fantasy television series
Animated television series about mice and rats
ProSieben original programming